Theretra alorica is a moth of the  family Sphingidae. It is known from Alor Island, part of the eastern Lesser Sunda Islands of Indonesia.

References

Theretra
Moths described in 2010